Estola seriata is a species of beetle in the family Cerambycidae. It was described by Theodor Franz Wilhelm Kirsch in 1875. It is known from Peru.

References

Estola
Beetles described in 1875